"Sweet Impact" is BoA's 22nd Japanese single. It was released on April 25, 2007 and it hit #5 on the Oricon chart on its first day of release. The song "Sweet Impact" was first featured in Japan's FASIO commercial in January 2007. The video was inspired by Michael Jackson's Moonwalker. The single has approximately sold over 5,000 copies in Korea. It is also her first single to feature different cover art for both the CD-Only and CD+DVD versions.

Track listings

CD

First Press Edition
 Sweet Impact (5:02)
 Bad Drive (3:31)
 So Real (ArmySlick's Scratch Build Vocal) (4:39)
 Sweet Impact (TV Mix) (5:02)
 Bad Drive (TV Mix) (3:28)

Regular Edition
 Sweet Impact (5:02)
 Bad Drive (3:31)
 Sweet Impact (TV Mix) (5:02)
 Bad Drive (TV Mix) (3:28)

DVD
 Sweet Impact (video clip) (5:06)

Live performances
2007.04.02 - Hey! Hey! Hey! Music Champ
2007.04.27 - Music Station
2007.05.04 - Music Fighter

Charts

Oricon Sales Chart (Japan)

References

External links
http://www.avexnet.or.jp/boa/index.html
 Official clip https://www.youtube.com/watch?v=LQIeUUmxO4M

BoA songs
2007 singles
2007 songs
Avex Trax singles